In grammar, the translative case (abbreviated ) is a grammatical case that indicates a change in state of a noun, with the general sense of "becoming X" or "change to X".

In Finnish, it is the counterpart of the essive case, with the basic meaning of a change of state. It is also used for expressing "in (a language)", "considering it is a (status)" and "by (a time)". Its ending is -ksi:
 pitkä "long", venyi pitkäksi "(it) stretched long"
 englanti "English", En osaa sanoa tätä englanniksi "I can't say this in English"
 pentu "cub", Se on pennuksi iso "For a cub, it is big"
 musta aukko "black hole", (muuttui) mustaksi aukoksi "(turned into) a black hole"
 kello kuusi "(at) six o' clock", kello kuudeksi "by six o' clock"

Examples in Estonian, where the ending is -ks:
 pikk "long", venis pikaks "(it) stretched long"
 must auk "black hole", (muutus/muundus) mustaks auguks "(turned into) a black hole"
 kell kuus "(at) six o' clock", kella kuueks "by six o' clock"
In Estonian, translative can also express a temporary or random state. E.g. while a nominative construction would indicate working in a job or profession, as olen koolis õpetaja "I'm a teacher in a school", a similar sentence using translative olen koolis õpetajaks "I work as a teacher in a school" hints at it either being a temporary position, the speaker not being fully qualified, or some other factor of impermanency.

In Hungarian, the ending is -vá / -vé after a vowel; it assimilates to the final consonant otherwise:

 só "salt", Lót felesége sóvá változott "Lot's wife turned into salt"
 fiú "boy; son"  fiává fogad "adopt as one's son"
 bolond "fool"  bolonddá tett engem "He made a fool out of me."

Further reading

References

Grammatical cases